Zico Phillips (born 2 July 1991) is a Barbadian footballer who plays for Paradise and the Barbadian national team.

He debuted internationally on 12 October 2019, in a match against the US Virgin Islands in a 1–0 victory in the CONCACAF Nations League.

On 15 October, Phillips scored his first goal for Barbados, securing its second consecutive victory over US Virgin Islands with a scored of 0–4 in the CONCACAF Nations League.

International goals

Honours

Club
Paradise
 Barbados FA Cup: 2018

References

1991 births
Living people
Barbadian footballers
Barbados international footballers
Association football defenders
Paradise FC (Barbados) players